Dmitry Hananovich Astrakhan (born March 17, 1957) is a Russian film director and actor. Honored Artist of the Russian Federation (2009).

Biography 
Dmitry Astrakhan was born in the family of Leningrad historians Hanan Markovich Astrakhan and Susanna Markovna Manevich, natives of Belarus. He was the youngest, the fifth child in the family. At school I was fond of reading, math and sports. After the end of the eighth grade, he entered the Physics and Mathematics School No. 30 on Vasilievsky Island and at the same time continued to engage in classical wrestling. After graduation, he was admitted to the Saint Petersburg Electrotechnical University. For several years, Dmitry replaced several institutions, until he was admitted to the Leningrad State Institute of Theater, Music and Cinematography, to the Musil class (graduated in 1982). As a thesis work was to stage a performance in the Alexandrinsky Theatre, however, according to Astrakhan himself, after the artistic director of the theater learned that Astrakhan was a Jew, they did not give the play.

From 1981 to 1987 he was the director of the Sverdlovsk theater of the young spectator. Then he served in the army (naval aviation). He staged performances in various theaters of Russia and abroad, trained at Tovstonogov in Leningrad.

From 1991 to 1995, he directed the Saint Petersburg Comedy Theatre.

In 2017 he became a member of the jury of 3rd Moscow Jewish Film Festival.

Filmography

As director (selected)
 Get Thee Out (1991)
 You Are My Only Love (1993)
 (1995)
 Everything Will Be Fine! (1995)
 From Hell to Hell (1997)
 Waiting Hall  (1998)
 Crossroads (1998)
 Contract with Death (1998)
 Give Me Moonlight (2001)
 Yellow Dwarf (2001)
 Tartaren from Tarascon (2003) 
 All Honestly (2004)
 Golden Country (2011)
 Little Children (2012)
 Love Without Rules (2016)

As actor (selected)
 Everything Will Be Fine! (1995) as mathematician
 From Hell to Hell (1997) as JDC employee
 Vysotsky. Thank You For Being Alive (2011) as Leonid Fridman
 Chagall — Malevich (2014) as Itzke, Rabbi
 The End of a Beautiful Epoch (2015) as Misha Shablinsky
 Goznak (2015) as fashion designer
 What Men Talk About. Continuation (2018) as serving at the funeral

Awards
1991
 Moscow International Film Festival –  Ecumenical Jury Award Special Mention (Get Thee Out)	
1995
 Love is Folly International Film Festival (Bulgaria) – Golden Aphrodite	(Everything Will Be Fine!)
2012
 Nika Award – Discovery of the Year (Vysotsky. Thank You For Being Alive)
2016
 Golden Eagle Award – Best Supporting Actor (The End of a Beautiful Epoch)

References

External links

1957 births
Living people
Soviet film directors
Russian film directors
Male actors from Saint Petersburg
Theatre directors from Saint Petersburg
Soviet male film actors
Russian male film actors
Russian male television actors
Russian television presenters
Recipients of the Nika Award
Russian State Institute of Performing Arts alumni
Soviet Jews
Jewish Russian actors